The High Line Canal (HLC) is a man-made waterway, used for irrigation and recreation, that serves the Denver-Aurora metropolitan area.

Source:

Origin of the name

The High Line Canal is not the only one so named. Others in Colorado include the Farmer's High Line (which flows from Golden passing through Westminster and Thornton); the Government High Line (which irrigates Grand Junction and the surrounding Grand Valley); and the Rocky Ford High Line (which irrigates land in the Arkansas River Valley around Boone, Fowler, Manzanola, and Rocky Ford). Elsewhere in Colorado and in other western states, there are a number of additional canals named "High Line" or "Highline".

High Line canals are named after the engineering principle by which they are designed. The "high line principle" calls for a canal to follow the contours of the terrain, with a minimal drop in elevation per mile along its course. Thus the canal follows the line of highest possible elevation that allows its flow to be driven by gravity (so that neither pumping nor electricity is required for transporting the water). As a result, High Line canals typically have many twists and turns as they maintain elevation by traversing natural valleys first in an upstream direction, then back down the opposite side, then around dividing ridges, and so on.

Developmental struggles
The company originally intended to place about 50,000 acres under cultivation, but it had difficulty securing sufficient water because earlier ditches held irrigation rights based on prior claims. Court cases regarding water rights dragged on for years. Because the High Line Canal's water rights were junior to 74 other canals in the South Platte watershed, it was frequently dry. Although the agricultural development that the HLC was meant to spawn never fully materialized, the canal nevertheless nourished the growth of both Denver and its eastern suburb, Aurora. In 1924, Denver Water took over the canal.

Irrigation
The HLC was designed to carry nearly three-quarters of a billion gallons of water per day, but actually averages only 71 million gallons. When the Rocky Mountain Arsenal was built in 1942, a lateral was built off the HLC (at about mile 64) in order to supply water to the chemical weapons manufacturing center, and until about 2008, the Rocky Mountain Arsenal National Wildlife Refuge was the furthest-downstream customer that was still taking water delivery via the HLC. However, the canal does not provide a very efficient method of delivering water; Denver Water estimates 60% to 80% of water in the canal is lost to seepage or evaporation. As a result, the Arsenal is now provided with recycled water instead of canal water, and as of 2011, the HLC's last customer is Fairmount Cemetery (at about mile 48). However, Denver Water still occasionally sends water further downstream, in order to water the trees that line the canal's bank. Denver Water has vacated the HLC downstream from mile 66.3 in Green Valley Ranch, and today there is very little visible evidence of the additional five miles that historically extended beyond that point.

Recreation
Although the HLC was originally built for the purpose of irrigation, today it is better known to Colorado residents as a source of recreation. The canal itself (and the water flowing through it) is owned by Denver Water, and the adjoining maintenance road was entirely closed to the public until 1970. Designated a National Landmark Trail, it is a popular destination for Denver's outdoor enthusiasts and is open all year to hikers, bikers, joggers, and (along some segments) equestrians. The High Line Canal Trail is shaded for much of its length by mature cottonwood trees, and the surface of the pathway ranges from hard-packed dirt to concrete. Though the HLC is owned by Denver Water, five agencies have recreational agreements to maintain sections of the trails:

The HLC supplies water to Buell Lake in Cherry Hills Village.

Wildlife
Deer, ducks, geese, turtles, hawks, herons, pelicans, raccoon, fox, coyotes, mountain lions, and various other animals have been spotted on or around the canal and surrounding trails.

References

External links
Denver Water: High Line Canal (official)
Denver Water: High Line Canal (map)
Douglas County: Open Space, High Line Canal Regional Trail
Trails.com summary of Highline Canal Trail
City of Littleton: Irrigation Projects
Detailed interactive map showing trail conditions, milepost locations, photos, etc.
Historic American Engineering Record (HAER) documentation:

Protected areas of Douglas County, Colorado
Geography of Aurora, Colorado
Geography of Denver
Parks in Colorado
Canals in Colorado
Irrigation canals
Greenways
Historic American Engineering Record in Colorado
National Recreation Trails in Colorado
Irrigation in the United States
Protected areas of Adams County, Colorado
Protected areas of Arapahoe County, Colorado
Protected areas of Denver
Canals opened in 1883
Transportation in Adams County, Colorado
Buildings and structures in Adams County, Colorado
Transportation buildings and structures in Arapahoe County, Colorado
Transportation buildings and structures in Denver
Transportation buildings and structures in Douglas County, Colorado